Izvoarele is a commune located in Giurgiu County, Muntenia, Romania. It is composed of six villages: Chiriacu, Dimitrie Cantemir, Izvoarele, Petru Rareș, Radu Vodă and Valea Bujorului.

References

Communes in Giurgiu County
Localities in Muntenia